Ynys y Bîg is a small private island in the Menai Strait attached to the island of Anglesey (in North Wales) by a wooden bridge. The bridge runs from the grounds of a private house, itself also called Ynys y Bîg, preventing any public access. The bridge fell into disrepair but was reconstructed in 2019.

The island lies about 1 mile north-east of the Menai Suspension Bridge and is part of the Glannau Porthaethwy SSSI. At mean low tide there is no water separating it from the mainland, whilst at high tide it is separate with an area of 0.7 acres. It is heavily wooded and in some years herons nest there in some numbers.

References

Islands of Anglesey
Menai Strait
Cwm Cadnant
Coast of Anglesey
Sites of Special Scientific Interest on Anglesey
Private islands of the United Kingdom